Sieglitz may refer to:

Sieglitz (river), of Thuringia, Germany
Szczyglice, Lower Silesian Voivodeship (German name Sieglitz), a village in Lower Silesian Voivodeship, Poland
Sieglitz, a district of the municipality Lommatzsch, Saxony, Germany